Mike Stewart is an American politician from the state of Tennessee. He was a Democratic member of the Tennessee House of Representatives, representing the 52nd district. Stewart was the chair of the Tennessee House Democratic Caucus.

Personal History 
Before his election to the House, Stewart served in the Army, first in Korea, where he was awarded the Eighth Army Distinguished Leader Award, and later in Operation Desert Storm. Following Desert Storm, Stewart attended the University of Tennessee Law School, where he graduated cum laude in 1994. Stewart and his wife Ruth then moved to the East Nashville neighborhood of Lockeland Springs in order for Stewart to begin his legal career; he later practiced law at the Nashville law firm Waller Lansden Dortch & Davis, LLP before pursuing a career in politics. Stewart was elected President of the Lockeland Springs Neighborhood Association in 1998.

Career in the House 
First elected to the State House in 2008 to represent District 52, Stewart has served on the Criminal Justice, Ethics, Government Operations, and Rules Committees, and he made headlines when he brought an AR-15 style rifle, which he had legally purchased without a background check, into a committee meeting to make a statement about gun control.

References

External links
 
 Biography at Ballotpedia
Legislative website

1965 births
Living people
Democratic Party members of the Tennessee House of Representatives
People from Oak Ridge, Tennessee
Politicians from Nashville, Tennessee
University of Pennsylvania alumni
University of Tennessee College of Law alumni
United States Army personnel of the Gulf War
21st-century American politicians
United States Army soldiers